Eucalyptus tenuis is a species of slender mallet that is endemic to the southwest of Western Australia. It has smooth bark, lance-shaped adult leaves, flower buds in groups of three, creamy white flowers and conical, cup-shaped or bell-shaped fruit.

Description
It has smooth pale grey to brownish bark that is shed in long ribbons. Flowering has been recorded in March and the flowers are creamy white.

Taxonomy and naming
Eucalyptus tenuis was first formally described in 1993 by Ian Brooker and Stephen Hopper in the journal Nuytsia from specimens collected by Brooker near the Burra Rock Road south of Coolgardie in 1983. The specific epithet (tenuis) is a Latin word meaning "thin" or "slender", referring to the slender stems of this mallet.

Distribution and habitat
This mallet occurs sporadically between Coolgardie, Norseman  and Hyden, where it grows in red sandy-loam-clay soils.

Conservation status
This eucalypt is classified as "not threatened" by the Western Australian Government Department of Parks and Wildlife.

See also
List of Eucalyptus species

References

Eucalypts of Western Australia
tenuis
Myrtales of Australia
Plants described in 1993
Taxa named by Ian Brooker
Taxa named by Stephen Hopper